Hednota macroura is a moth in the family Crambidae. It was described by Oswald Bertram Lower in 1902. It is found in Australia, where it has been recorded from South Australia.

References

Crambinae
Moths described in 1902